Holy See–Serbia relations are foreign relations between the Holy See and Serbia. Both countries established diplomatic relations in March 1919. The Holy See has an embassy in Belgrade. Serbia has an embassy to the Holy See in Rome.

The Holy See has decided to withhold recognition of Kosovo as part of an agreement with Russia and the Russian Orthodox Church, and this has led to a warming of Vatican-Serbia relations.

History

Before the establishment of the formal bilateral relations

Economic, social and political interactions between Italia and Serbia are of historical longue durée and were intensive ever since the Roman Empire conquered the region.

The baptism of Grand Prince of Serbia Stefan Nemanja was latin rite catholic, in the Serbian Medieval State of Duklja.

The coronation of Grand Prince of Serbia Stefan the First-Crowned (1165–1228) was performed by a legate of Pope Urban II, which led some Serbian historians to conclude that Stefan converted to Catholicism.

Stefan's third wife, Venetian noblewoman Anna Dandolo, a Catholic, became Queen of Serbia and was mother to Stefan Uroš I. Popular legend claims that the Žiča Monastery, seat of the Serbian Orthodox Church between 1219–1253, was intentionally constructed on the half way between Rome and Constantinople.

See also
Saint Sava
Miroslav Gospel
Genocide of Serbs in the Independent State of Croatia
Catholic clergy involvement with the Ustaše
Foreign relations of the Holy See
Foreign relations of Serbia
Holy See–Yugoslavia relations

Notes

References

External links
 Serbian Ministry of Foreign Affairs about the bilateral relation with the Holy See
 Serbian Ministry of Foreign Affairs: direction of the Holy See’s embassy in Belgrade
 Serbian Ministry of Foreign Affairs: direction of the Serbian embassy to the Holy See

 
Bilateral relations of Serbia
Serbia